Incremental operating margin is the increase or decrease of income from continuing operations before stock-based compensation, interest expense and income-tax expense between two periods, divided by the increase or decrease in revenue between the same two periods.

Business economics